Sporosarcina newyorkensis is a Gram-positive and endospore-forming bacterium from the genus of Sporosarcina which has been isolated from human blood and raw cow milk.

References 

Bacillales
Bacteria described in 2012